Minuscule 183 (in the Gregory-Aland numbering), ε 221 (Soden), is a Greek minuscule manuscript of the New Testament, on parchment. Paleographically it has been assigned to the 12th century. It has marginalia.

Description 

The codex contains a complete text of the four Gospels on 349 parchment leaves (size ). The text is written in one column per page, in 24 lines per page (size of column 9.2 by 6.8 cm), in dark-brown ink, the large initial letters in gold, small initial letters in red.

There is also a division according to the smaller Ammonian Sections (in Mark 234 sections, the last in 16:9), with references to the Eusebian Canons (in gold).

Text 

The Greek text of the codex is a representative of the Byzantine text-type. Aland placed it in Category V.
Hermann von Soden included it to the textual family Kx. According to the Claremont Profile Method it represents textual family Kx in Luke 1 and Luke 20. It creates textual cluster 183. In Luke 10 no profile was made.

It creates textual cluster with minuscule 793.

History 

It is dated by the INTF to the 12th century.

It was examined by Birch, Scholz, and Burgon. C. R. Gregory saw the manuscript in 1886.

It is currently housed at the Laurentian Library (Plutei. VI. 14), at Florence.

See also 
 List of New Testament minuscules
 Biblical manuscript
 Textual criticism

References

Further reading 

 

Greek New Testament minuscules
12th-century biblical manuscripts